Forgiveness is the third studio album by Canadian country music artist Jim Witter. It was released on January 14, 2003 by Curb Records. The album was nominated for a GMA Dove Award for Inspirational Album of the Year in 2004. It was also nominated at the Juno Awards of 2004 for Contemporary Christian/Gospel Album of the Year.

Track listing

References

2003 albums
Jim Witter albums
Curb Records albums
Contemporary Christian music albums by Canadian artists